

People
Staley (surname)

Places
At Stalybridge, Greater Manchester, England, the mediaeval manor of Staley which forms part of the town
Staley, North Carolina
Staley, Colorado Springs

Other
 A. E. Staley, a processor of corn located in Decatur, Illinois, and now part of Tate & Lyle, PLC
 The Chicago Bears, formerly Decatur Staleys, a football club established by the A. E. Staley Company
 Staley Da Bear, mascot of the Chicago Bears, named after the A. E. Staley Company